The Cook County, Illinois, general election was held on November 3, 2020. Elections was held for Clerk of the Circuit Court, State's Attorney, Cook County Board Of Review district 1, three seats on the Water Reclamation District Board, and judgeships on the Circuit Court of Cook County.

Primary elections, held using the open primary system, took take place on March 17, 2020.

Election information
The primaries and general elections for Cook County races coincided with those for federal races (President, House, and Senate) and those for state elections.

Voter turnout

Primary election
For the primaries, turnout was 33.54%, with 1,037,951 ballots cast. The ballots cast comprised 957,791 Democratic, 79,669 Republican, and 491 nonpartisan primary ballots. Turnout in the city of Chicago was 37.78%, while turnout in suburban Cook County was 29.42%.

Turnout in the primaries was considered to be low for a presidential primary. The low turnout was attributed by many to the ongoing COVID-19 pandemic. The potentially suppressed turnout of election-day voting as a result of virus concerns was partially offset by high in-person early voting and mail-in ballot numbers. 339,000 people cast early votes, a record number, with Chicago seeing 172,000, and the rest of Cook County seeing 167,000 early votes, a record for each jurisdiction. The election also saw a record number of requests made for mail-in ballots, with both Chicago and the rest of Cook County seeing numbers of requests surpassing any previous election. In Chicago there were 118,000 such requests, with over 80,000 mail-in ballots ultimately being returned and counted. In suburban Cook County, 47,652 mail-in ballots were returned, setting a record. In Chicago, 45% of votes cast were either early votes or votes by mail.  In suburban Cook County, 56% of votes cast were either early votes or votes by mail.

The county's turnout was higher than the statewide turnout rate of 28.36%.

General election
For the general election, turnout was 72.20%, with 2,349,010 ballots cast. Turnout in the city of Chicago was 73.28%, while turnout in suburban Cook County was 71.18%.

The county, as a whole, saw a turnout that was slightly below the statewide turnout rate of 72.92%.

Clerk of the Circuit Court 

The incumbent fifth-term clerk of the Circuit Court of Cook County, Dorothy Brown, announced in 2019 that she would not run for re-election. Brown had been the subject of a federal corruption investigation when she made the announcement. Democrat Iris Martinez was elected to succeed her.

The last Republican to hold this office was Brown's immediate predecessor Aurelia Pucinski, who, while elected a Democrat in each of her elections to the office, had switched parties in her final term.

Primaries

Democratic
All four candidates in the Democratic Party primary for the office pledged to modernize the office and to address corruption.

Candidates
The following candidates ran for the Democratic Party nomination for Clerk of the Circuit Court:

Endorsements

Polls

Results

Republican
Candidates
The following candidates ran for the Republican party nomination for Clerk of the Circuit Court: 

Write-in candidates
Richard Mayers, perennial candidate and alleged white supremacist, write-in candidate for Chicago Mayor, City Clerk, Treasurer, and alderman in 2019; congressional candidate in 2000, 2002, 2008, 2016, 2018, and 2020; 1998 State House candidate; 1993 Berwyn city clerk and city treasurer candidate; write-in candidate for U.S. Senator in 2020; write-in candidate in 2020 Illinois Republican presidential primary

Results

General election
Endorsements

Results

State's Attorney 

Incumbent Cook County state's attorney Kim Foxx won reelection to a second term.

Foxx defeated three opponents in the Democratic primary and Republican Pat O'Brien in the general election.

Only Democrats have held this office ever since Richard A. Devine unseated Republican Jack O'Malley in 1996.

Primaries

Democratic
Incumbent Kim Foxx faced three opponents in the, two former Assistant State's Attorneys, Bill Conway and Donna More, and former Chicago alderman Bob Fioretti.

The money spent in the Democratic primary made this the most expensive State's Attorney election in Cook County to date. Conway raised $11.9 million in campaign funds, most of which was from his father William E. Conway's cumulative donations of $10.5 million. Foxx raised $2.8 million, and her biggest donors include Fred Eychaner and the political action committee of SEIU Illinois. More raised $406,000 and Fioretti raised $20,000.

Candidates
The following candidates ran for the Democratic Party nomination for State's Attorney:

Endorsements

Polls

Results

Republican
Pat O'Brien defeated Christopher Pfannkuche. Pfannkuche had been the Republican nominee for State's Attorney in 2016.

Candidates
The following candidates ran for the Republican party nomination for State's Attorney: 

Write-in candidates
Richard Mayers, perennial candidate and alleged white supremacist, write-in candidate for Chicago Mayor, City Clerk, Treasurer, and alderman in 2019; congressional candidate in 2000, 2002, 2008, 2016, 2018, and 2020; 1998 State House candidate; 1993 Berwyn city clerk and city treasurer candidate; write-in candidate for U.S. Senator in 2020; write-in candidate in 2020 Illinois Republican presidential primary

Endorsements

Results

General election
Polls

Endorsements

Results

Cook County Board of Review

In the 2020 Cook County Board of Review election, one seat, Republican-held, out of its three seats is up for election. Incumbent Dan Patlak is seeking reelection.

The Cook County Board of Review has its three seats rotate the length of terms. In a staggered fashion (in which no two seats have coinciding two-year terms), the seats rotate between two consecutive four-year terms and a two-year term.

1st district

Incumbent second-term Cook County Board of Review Commissioner for the 1st district, Dan Patlak, a third-term Republican last reelected in 2016, was unseated by Democrat Tammy Wendt.

This election was to a two-year term.

Primaries

Democratic
Candidates
The following candidates ran for the Democratic Party nomination:

Endorsements

Results

Republican
Candidates
The following candidates ran for the Republican party nomination: 

Results

General election
Endorsements

Results

Water Reclamation District Board 

Three of the nine seats on the Metropolitan Water Reclamation District of Greater Chicago board are up for election in 2020. Each winning candidate will serve a six-year term on the board. All candidates will appear together on the ballot, and voters can vote for up to three candidates (in both the primary and the general).

All three incumbents were Democrats. Incumbents Kimberly Neely Dubuclet and  Cam Davis won reelection, while Frank Avila lost renomination. Democrat Eira L. Corral also won election.

Primaries

Democratic
Candidates
The following candidates are running for the Democratic Party nomination:
 Frank Avila, incumbent Water Reclamation District Board commissioner
 Heather Boyle
 Mike Cashman
  Cam Davis, incumbent Water Reclamation District Board commissioner
 Deyon Dean
 Kimberly Neely Dubuclet, incumbent Water Reclamation District Board commissioner
 Patricia Theresa Flynn
 Michael Grace
 Shundar Lin
 Eira Corral Sepúlveda

The following candidates were removed from the ballot:
 Kisha McCaskill

Results

Republican
No candidates were included on the ballot in the Republican primary. While two official write-in candidates did run, neither received a sufficient share of the vote for them to win nomination.

Write-in candidates
Richard Mayers, perennial candidate and alleged white supremacist, write-in candidate for Chicago Mayor, City Clerk, Treasurer, and alderman in 2019; congressional candidate in 2000, 2002, 2008, 2016, 2018, and 2020; 1998 State House candidate; 1993 Berwyn city clerk and city treasurer candidate; write-in candidate for U.S. Senator in 2020; write-in candidate in 2020 Illinois Republican presidential primary
Frank Rowder

Results

Green
The Green Party nominated Troy Hernandez, Tammie Vinson, and Rachel Wales.

General election
Endorsements

Results

Judicial elections 

Partisan elections was held to fill 13 judgeships in the Circuit Court of Cook County and 21 judgeships in subcircuits of the court. There were Democratic Party candidates for all 34 elections, whereas the Republican primary had been canceled for all but two vacancies. Retention elections were also held for judgeships on these courts.

See also 

 2020 Illinois elections
 Illinois Fair Tax (Statewide Constitutional Amendment on the 2020 ballot)

Notes 

Partisan clients

References

External links
 
 
  (State affiliate of the U.S. League of Women Voters)
 

Cook County
2020
Cook County 2020
Cook County